Talamantez is a surname. Notable people with the surname include:

Abel Talamantez (born 1978), Mexican American singer
Esmi Talamantez, Tejano singer
Inés Talamantez (died 2019), Mescalero ethnographer and theologian
Luis Talamantez, writer, poet, and prisoner's rights activist